The soundtrack for the 1997 film Anna Karenina, directed by Bernard Rose, was conformed of several Russian classical themes by Pyotr Ilyich Tchaikovsky and also themes from Russian folklore and traditional musical pieces. The music was performed by the St. Petersburg Philharmonic Orchestra, under the baton of Sir Georg Solti. The film's score was composed by Stewart Copeland.

Track listing
 The Well (1:45)*
 At the Ball- Waltz from "Swan Lake" (6:40)
 Vronsky Follows Anna to St. Petersburg (2:14)*
 Vronsky Watches Anna at the Ballet- Scene No. 10 from "Swan Lake" (2:57)
 At Betsy's Home (2:45)*
 Anna and Vronksy (1:04)*
 The Horse race (3:23)*
 Karenin's Summer Villa (3:51)*
 Harvesting the Field- Traditional Russian Chant (2:04)
 Cavalry Officer's Party- Traditional Gypsy Song (2:00)
 Vronsky Attempts Suicide (2:20)*
 Vronsky and Anna in Italy (2:26)*
 Vronsky and Princess Sorokina at the Opera- The Letter scene from "Eugene Onegin" (4:20)
 Anna's Tragic End (4:54)*
 Lydia Inspires the Troops- "Song about Nevsky" by Sergei Prokofiev (3:07)
 Kitty and Levin at the Farm- "Lord, Now Lettest Thou Thy Servant Depart" Vespers, No. 5 Op. 37 By Sergei Rachmaninoff (3:40)
 End Credits- Violin Concerto in D Major, Op. 35, mvt. 1 (4:59)
 Bonus Track- Scherzo (Complete) (8:12)*

Excerpts from Symphony No. 6, by Piotr Ilich Tchaikovsky. 
Note.All cues composed by Tchaikovsky except where noted.

The score makes a prominent use of Tchaikovsky's Symphony No. 6 being used in pivotal scenes from the film. Sir Georg Solti and Bernard Rose agreed that this Symphony portrayed Anna Karenina's story perfectly, since the music contained several movements, from excessively cheerful allegros to exaggerated tragic adagios, that contained parallels to Anna's story.

References

Film scores
Drama film soundtracks
1997 soundtrack albums